The Linksys iPhone was a line of internet appliances from Cisco Systems.  The first iPhone model – released by Infogear in 1998 – combined the features of a regular phone and a web terminal.  The company was later purchased by Cisco and no new products were marketed under the name between 2001 and 2006.  At the end of 2006, Cisco rebranded its Linksys VoIP-based phones under the name, shortly before Apple released an iPhone of its own.  This led to a trademark dispute between the two companies, which was resolved on February 20, 2007.

History

InfoGear iPhone

The first iPhone was released in 1998 by InfoGear Technology Corporation.  In 1997, prior to the release of iPhone, Infogear entered into a partnership with Cidco of Morgan Hill, California. The iPhone was an innovative internet appliance that featured a sliding keyboard and an LCD touchscreen that accessed an embedded web browser and an email client.  It was one of the first wave of internet appliances, preceding the I-Opener, 3Com Audrey and a slew of similar devices from various manufacturers including Alcatel and Nortel.  Reviewers praised it for offering a simple and  "relatively inexpensive" way to access the Internet, but many criticized its size, lack of features, and US $5 per month in addition to the Internet access charge and the purchase price (US $299).  

Infogear was acquired by Cisco Systems in 2000, A new model was introduced in 2001, but the product was soon discontinued.

On December 18, 2006, Cisco Systems rebranded an existing line of Linksys Voice over IP internet phones, as it introduced some additional models.

Linksys was acquired by Cisco in June 2003, long after the production of Infogear iPhone had ceased. Unlike its name-sake predecessor, the new iPhone devices use an existing network and proprietary protocols, such as Skype. Rebranding did not involve any feature changes or introduction of new proprietary technology.

Netgear continues the iPhone line under new name
iPhone technology previously sold by Linksys was previously, but no longer, available from Netgear as the released in 2007 Netgear SPH200D. Handsets for the two are interchangeable. Linksys never sold additional handsets, leaving Linksys CIT400 users with only one handset although the base station for the CIT400/SPH200D supports up to four. The Netgear SPH150D supplemental handset fills that gap.

Models

1997-2001 
The first-generation InfoGear iPhone shipped in 1997 and the second in 1999.

2006-2007 
Linksys iPhone CIT line (with CIT200, CIT300, CIT310 and CIT400 models), released in 2006, was just a rebranding and facelift of (existing from 2004) Linksys CIT line. This line has a neutral reviews.

Linksys iPhone WIP line (with WIP300, WIP320 and WIP330 models) released in the same 2006, but as a new line. This line also has relatively neutral reviews.

Apple iPhone and trademark dispute

On January 9, 2007, Steve Jobs announced that Apple Inc. would begin selling its mobile smartphone called iPhone in June of that year. Cisco announced shortly after the announcement that Apple had been in negotiations to use the trademark that Cisco acquired with the purchase of Infogear. However, a day later they announced that they were filing a lawsuit against Apple.

Apple and Cisco settled their dispute on February 20, 2007. Both companies will be allowed to use the "iPhone" name in exchange for "exploring interoperability" between Apple's products and Cisco's services and other unspecified terms.

References

Information appliances
VoIP hardware
Computer-related introductions in 1997
Linksys